Denis 'Dinny' Allen (born 9 August 1952 in Cork, Ireland) is a retired Gaelic football manager and former dual player. He played both hurling and Gaelic football with his local club Nemo Rangers and was a member of the Cork senior inter-county teams in both codes from 1972 until 1989. Allen is regarded as one of the greatest Gaelic footballers of all time.

Playing career

Club

Allen played his club football with the famous Nemo Rangers club in Cork and enjoyed much success. He secured his first senior county championship winners' medal in 1970 as 'Nemo' trounced west Cork side Dohenys. The club's march to success continued later in the year as the club captured the Munster club title following a three-game saga with Kerry champions Austin Stacks. Nemo Rangers werelater trounced in the All-Ireland semi-final.

After surrendering their county title in 1976, Nemo were back the following year with Allen picking up a second county winners' medal. A third county championship of the decade followed in 1978 before Allen collected a second Munster club title. The subsequent All-Ireland final pitted Nemo against Scotstown of Monaghan. Snow hampered the game, however, Cogan proved the hero as Nemo won the game by 2–9 to 1–3. It was his first All-Ireland club winners' medal.

In 1981 Allen won his fourth county championship title following a 3–11 to 0–6 defeat of Bantry Blues. A third Munster club winners' medal quickly followed before Allen lined out in another All-Ireland final. Mayo champions Garrymore provided the opposition, however, Nemo were far too powerful. Allen scored 2–2 in the first half and the Cork champs had an extraordinary 5–6 to 0–1 lead at the interval. Nemo went on to secure a record 6–11 to 1–8 victory and Allen collected a second All-Ireland winners' medal.

After losing out in 1982, Nemo were back in 1983 and Allen won his fifth county championship winners' medal. A fourth Munster club title soon followed before another All-Ireland final appearance beckoned. Walterstown provided the opposition, however, Nemo proved to be the masters again. Allen engineered two goal chances for Ephie FitzGerald as the Cork champions sealed a 2–10 to 0–5 victory. The win gave Allen a third All-Ireland club title.

Nemo Rangers went into a slight decline following this victory. The club bounced back in 1987 with Allen winning his sixth county championship winners' medal. A fifth provincial club title quickly followed, however, Nemo were subsequently defeated in the All-Ireland semi-final.

Allen secured a seventh county championship title in 1988 as Duhallow fell in the championship decider. He later picked up his sixth Munster club winners' medal as Nemo completely dominated the inter-county club championship again. Another All-Ireland final beckoned, this time with Roscommon champions Clan na Gael providing the opposition. Eoin O'Mahoney's free-taking helped Nemo to victory and Allen ended his club football career with a fourth All-Ireland winners' medal.

Inter-county

Allen first came to prominence on the inter-county scene as a member of the Cork under-21 football team in the early 1970s. He captured a Munster title in this grade in 1971 following a two-goal defeat of Cork. Allen's side later qualified for the All-Ireland final with Fermanagh providing the opposition. A 3–10 to 0–3 score line gave Cork the victory and gave Allen an All-Ireland under-21 winners' medal. That year he also helped Cork win the Munster Junior Championship.

Allen made his senior debut for Cork in the 1972 Munster final. Cork were defeated on that occasion, however, Allen was singled out as one of Cork football's rising stars. That same year he also played soccer with Cork Hibernians, going on to win an FAI Cup winners' medal in 1973. He also later played with Cork Celtic F.C. He showed great promise as a soccer player, however, he remained in Ireland in spite of being offered the chance to play for Brian Clough's Nottingham Forest. This involvement in soccer was allegedly frowned upon by some in the Gaelic Athletic Association. Because of this Allen lost his place on the Cork panel for 1973. That year Cork claimed both the Munster and All-Ireland titles, however, Allen had missed out.

Two years later in 1975 Allen returned to the Cork GAA set-up, this time as a member of the senior inter-county team. He captured a Munster winners' medal that year following the provincial final trouncing of Limerick. Cork, however, were defeated by surprise package Galway in the subsequent All-Ireland semi-final. This defeat brought Allen's hurling involvement to an end. Unfortunately for Allen, Cork went on to win the next three All-Ireland titles.

The following year Allen was appointed captain of the Cork senior football team. It was unfortunate for Allen that his senior inter-county football career coincided with the era of the greatest Kerry football team of all time. Cork lost eight consecutive Munster finals between 1975 and 1982. For a while it looked as if fate would result in Allen ending his career without any success with the footballers.

In 1983 Kerry were aiming to capture a record-breaking ninth Munster title in-a-row. Cork had different ideas and provided stern opposition. At the full-time whistle Cork were the champions by the narrowest of margins. After eighth consecutive provincial final defeats, the 3–10 to 3–9 score line finally gave Allen a Munster winners' medal. The subsequent All-Ireland semi-final pitted Cork against Dublin. That game ended in a draw and the replay was played at Páirc Uí Chaoimh. In spite of Allen scoring two goals Cork were outclassed on that occasion as 'the Dubs' won by 4–15 to 2–10.

Kerry reclaimed their provincial title in 1984 and it looked as if Allen's career was drawing to a close. That same year he was named on a special team to mark the centenary year of the Gaelic Athletic Association. Allen was named in the left corner-forward position on the Football Team of the Century, made up of player swho never won a senior All-Ireland medal.

In 1986 Allen was dropped from the panel. He was recalled to the side two years later in 1988 at the age of 36 and captured a second Munster winners' medal following a narrow 1–14 to 0–16 win over arch-rivals Kerry. Cork later qualified for the All-Ireland final with Meath providing the opposition. Cork stormed ahead after just three minutes when Teddy McCarthy scored the only goal of five consecutive All-Ireland final appearances for Cork. Meath fought back and secured a 0–12 to 1–9 draw. The replay proved to be a tough, controversial affair with Meath reduced to fourteen men with the sending off of Gerry McEntee. In spite of being outnumbered Meath still won the game by 0–13 to 0–12.

Following this result Allen contemplated retiring from inter-county football, however, after another impressive campaign with Nemo Rangers he was persuaded by Billy Morgan to stay on for another year. His decision bore fruit as he was rewarded with the captaincy of the team. 1989 began well with Allen playing a key role in helping Cork to claim the National League title. He later added a third Munster medal to his collection following another win over Kerry. The subsequent All-Ireland final saw Mayo play Cork in a unique pairing. Cork were on top for much of the game, however, a goal by substitute Anthony Finnerty gave Mayo a brief lead. Mayo failed to score for the last nineteen minutes as Teddy McCarthy took over and gave a masterful display at midfield. Cork held on to win the game by 0–17 to 1–11. Seventeen years after he first lined out for Cork Allen had finally collected a senior All-Ireland winners' medal. He also had the honour of accepting the Sam Maguire Cup on behalf of his county.

Allen retired from inter-county football following this triumph.

Personal life
He is married to Frances Barry-Murphy, sister of Jimmy Barry-Murphy.

Career statistics

Honours

Player

Nemo Rangers
All-Ireland Senior Club Football Championship: 1979, 1982, 1984, 1989
Munster Senior Club Football Championship: 1975, 1978, 1981, 1983, 1987, 1988
Cork Senior Football Championship: 1972, 1975, 1977, 1978, 1981, 1983, 1987, 1988
Cork Intermediate Hurling Championship: 1971
Cork Minor Football Championship: 1970
Cork Minor Hurling Championship: 1970

Cork
All-Ireland Senior Football Championship: 1989 (c)
Munster Senior Football Championship: 1983, 1988, 1989 (c)
Munster Senior Hurling Championship: 1975
All-Ireland Under-21 Football Championship: 1971
Munster Under-21 Football Championship: 1971

Munster
Railway Cup: 1976, 1977, 1981, 1982

Manager

Nemo Rangers
All-Ireland Senior Club Football Championship: 1994
Munster Senior Club Football Championship: 1993
Cork Senior Football Championship: 1993

References

1952 births
Living people
All-Ireland-winning captains (football)
Dual players
Nemo Rangers Gaelic footballers
Cork inter-county Gaelic footballers
Munster inter-provincial Gaelic footballers
Nemo Rangers hurlers
Cork inter-county hurlers
League of Ireland players
Gaelic footballers who switched code
Cork Hibernians F.C. players
Cork Celtic F.C. players
Winners of one All-Ireland medal (Gaelic football)
Association footballers not categorized by position
Republic of Ireland association footballers